Dr. Jim is a 1921 American silent drama film directed by William Worthington and starring Frank Mayo, Claire Windsor and Robert Anderson.

Cast
 Frank Mayo as Dr. Jim Keene
 Claire Windsor as Helen Keene
 Oliver Cross as Kenneth Cord
 Stanhope Wheatcroft as Bobby Thorne
 Robert Anderson as 	Tom Anderson
 Herbert Heyes as 	Captain Blake
 Gordon Sackville as 	Assistant Doctor

References

Bibliography
 Connelly, Robert B. The Silents: Silent Feature Films, 1910-36, Volume 40, Issue 2. December Press, 1998.
 Munden, Kenneth White. The American Film Institute Catalog of Motion Pictures Produced in the United States, Part 1. University of California Press, 1997.

External links
 

1921 films
1921 drama films
1920s English-language films
American silent feature films
Silent American drama films
Films directed by William Worthington
American black-and-white films
Universal Pictures films
1920s American films